Miletinae is a subfamily of the family Lycaenidae of butterflies, commonly called harvesters and woolly legs, and virtually unique among butterflies in having predatory larvae. Miletinae are entirely aphytophagous (do not feed on plants). The ecology of the Miletinae is little understood, but adults and larvae live in association with ants, and most known species feed on Hemiptera (aphids, coccids, membracids, and psyllids), though some, like Liphyra, feed on the ants themselves. The butterflies, ants, and hemipterans, in some cases, seem to have complex symbiotic relationships benefiting all.

Systematics
Tribe Miletini
Allotinus C. & R. Felder, [1865] — Indomalayan realm
Lontalius Eliot, 1986 — Indomalayan realm
Miletus Hübner, [1819] — Indomalayan realm
Logania Distant, 1884 — Indomalayan realm
Megalopalpus Röber, [1886] — Afrotropical realm
Tribe Spalgini
Spalgis Moore, 1879 — Indomalayan realm, Afrotropical realm
Feniseca Grote, 1869 — Nearctic realm (one species, Feniseca tarquinius)
Taraka Doherty, 1889 — East Asian Palearctic realm, Indomalayan realm (sometimes in a separate tribe: Tarakini)
Tennenta Müller, 2017 — Australasian realm
Tribe Lachnocnemini
Lachnocnema Trimen, 1887 — Afrotropical realm
Thestor Hübner, [1819] — Afrotropical realm
Tribe Liphyrini (formerly a separate subfamily: Liphyrinae)
Euliphyra Holland, 1890 — Afrotropical realm
Aslauga Kirby, 1890 — Afrotropical realm
Liphyra Westwood, [1864] — Indomalayan realm, Australasian realm

References

Bernard d'Abrera (1986) Butterflies of the Oriental Region. Part 3: Lycaenidae and Riodinidae Hill House Publishers 
Bernard d'Abrera, (1980) Butterflies of the Afrotropical region based on Synonymic catalogue of the butterflies of the Ethiopian region by R.H. Carcasson. Lansdown Editions in association with E.W. Classey, Melbourne 
 Kaliszewska, Z.A., Lohman, D.J., Sommer, K., Adelson, G., Rand, D.B., Mathew, J., Talavera, G. & Pierce, N.E. 2015. When caterpillars attack: Biogeography and life history evolution of the Miletinae (Lepidoptera: Lycaenidae). Evolution 69(3): 571–588.

External links

Biodiversity Explorer
Royal Museum for Central Africa Images of Miletini (as Miletinae) 

 
Butterfly subfamilies